The Wall's grappletail, (Heliogomphus walli) is a species of dragonfly in the family Gomphidae. It is endemic to Sri Lanka. It is also known as Wall's round-tip clubtail in some texts.

See also 
 List of odonates of Sri Lanka

References

 walli.html World Dragonflies
 Animal diversity web
 IUCN Red List
 Query Results
 Sri Lanka Biodiversity
 List of odonates of Sri Lanka

Gomphidae
Insects described in 1925